Dick Hunt (born October 31, 1935) is an American speed skater. He competed at the 1960 Winter Olympics and the 1964 Winter Olympics.

References

1935 births
Living people
American male speed skaters
Olympic speed skaters of the United States
Speed skaters at the 1960 Winter Olympics
Speed skaters at the 1964 Winter Olympics
Sportspeople from Los Angeles